Lom u Tachova is a municipality and village in Tachov District in the Plzeň Region of the Czech Republic. It has about 500 inhabitants.

References

Villages in Tachov District